This is a list of Cypriot football transfers for the 2018–19 summer transfer window by club. Only transfers of clubs in the Cypriot First Division are included.

Cypriot First Division

Note: Flags indicate national team as has been defined under FIFA eligibility rules. Players may hold more than one non-FIFA nationality.

AEK Larnaca

In:

Out:

AEL Limassol

In:

Out:

Alki Oroklini

In:

Out:

Anorthosis Famagusta

In:

Out:

APOEL

In:

Out:

Apollon Limassol

In:

Out:

Doxa Katokopias

In:

Out:

Enosis Neon Paralimni

In:

Out:

Ermis Aradippou

In:

Out:

Nea Salamis Famagusta

In:

Out:

Omonia

In:

Out:

Pafos FC

In:

Out:

Cypriot Second Division

AEZ Zakakiou

In:

Out:

Akritas Chlorakas

In:

Out:

Anagennisi Deryneia

In:

Out:

Aris Limassol

In:

Out:

ASIL

In:

Out:

Ayia Napa

In:

Out:

Digenis Oroklinis

In:

Out:

Ethnikos Achna

In:

Out:

Karmiotissa

In:

Out:

MEAP Nisou

In:

Out:

Olympiakos Nicosia

In:

Out:

Omonia Aradippou

In:

Out:

Onisillos Sotira

In:

 
 
 

 

 

Out:

Othellos Athienou

In:

 

Out:

PAEEK

In:

 

Out:

THOI Lakatamia

In:

 

Out:

References

Football transfers summer 2018
Trans
Cypriot football transfers